Pål Hembre (born 20 April 1963) is a Norwegian Olympic sport shooter and World Champion.

Hembre became World Champion in 1994, in 25 metre center-fire pistol, and is twice military World Champion, from 1991 and 1992. He competed at the 1996 Summer Olympics in Atlanta.

References

External links

1963 births
Norwegian male sport shooters
ISSF rifle shooters
Olympic shooters of Norway
Shooters at the 1996 Summer Olympics
People from Molde
Living people
European Games competitors for Norway
Shooters at the 2015 European Games
Sportspeople from Møre og Romsdal
20th-century Norwegian people